Rosemary Barton Live is a Canadian television Sunday morning talk show, which premiered November 1, 2020 on CBC News Network and CBC Television. Hosted by Rosemary Barton, it is a live news and talk show covering political topics.

The series is a replacement for The Weekly with Wendy Mesley and also is a successor to The Sunday Scrum, a Sunday political segment which aired on CBC News Network in the 2000s and 2010s. The Sunday Scrum was hosted by a variety of CBC journalists over the course of its run, including Nancy Wilson, Ben Chin, Carole MacNeil, Reshmi Nair, Asha Tomlinson and John Northcott, and continues to air as a segment within Rosemary Barton Live rather than a standalone program.

The series received two Canadian Screen Award nominations at the 10th Canadian Screen Awards in 2022, for Best Talk Program or Series and Best Host in a Talk or Entertainment News Series.

References

External links 
 

Canadian Sunday morning talk shows
CBC News Network original programming
CBC Television original programming
Television shows filmed in Ottawa
2020 Canadian television series debuts
2020s Canadian television news shows